BigPark was a Canadian video game developer owned by Microsoft Studios.

History
Microsoft acquired BigPark in 2009, a few months prior to the announcement of the Kinect sensor (known then as "Project Natal"). Their first project was to be Joy Ride, a casual racing title which incorporated Xbox Live Avatars and used the Kinect motion sensing device. The game was originally intended to be a free Xbox Live Arcade game, but was eventually renamed Kinect Joy Ride and became a launch title for Kinect. Later, the company became more involved in providing interactive content that would be shown alongside live television as part of the Xbox One platform. As Microsoft moved away from the Kinect around 2016, BigPark along with several other studios that had been part of Microsoft's Kinect efforts were folded into the company.

Games
 Kinect Joy Ride — Xbox 360 (2010)
 Kinect Sports: Season Two — Xbox 360 (2011)
 Joy Ride Turbo — Xbox LIVE Arcade (2012)

References

External links
 Official website

2007 establishments in British Columbia
2016 disestablishments in British Columbia
Canadian companies established in 2007
Companies based in Vancouver
Defunct video game companies of Canada
Former Microsoft subsidiaries
Video game companies disestablished in 2016
Video game companies established in 2007
Video game development companies